Ondangwa Rural is an electoral constituency in the Oshana Region of Namibia. It had 13,613 inhabitants in 2016 and 7,682 registered voters . The administrative centre of the constituency is the settlement Eheke.

Ondangwa Rural was created by splitting the former constituency of Ondangwa into a rural and an urban part in August 2013, following a recommendation of the Fourth Delimitation Commission of Namibia, and in preparation of the 2014 general election.

Politics
Ondangwa is traditionally a stronghold of the South West Africa People's Organization (SWAPO) party. The following people have served as councillors of Ondangwa Rural (until 2013: Ondangwa) constituency:
 Prinse Shiimi (1992–1998)
 Ismael Uugwanga (1999–2010)
 Alfeus Abraham (since 2011)

In the 2015 local and regional elections councillor Abraham won uncontested after no opposition party nominated a candidate. Abraham was again reelected in the 2020 regional election, winning with 2,170 votes over Armas Ntinda of the Independent Patriots for Change (IPC), an opposition party formed in August 2020, with 944 votes.

References

Constituencies of Oshana Region
States and territories established in 2013
2013 establishments in Namibia